Design Factory (DF) or Aalto Design Factory (ADF) is one of the three factories of Aalto University. The stated purpose of the Design Factory is to be a constantly developing environment for learning, teaching, research and industry co-operation related to product development and design.

The director of Design Factory is professor Kalevi Ekman.

The current company partners of DF are Nokia (supporting partner), Kone (project sponsor), Aito, Bravo Media, Powerkiss, Seos Design, Uploud Audio, and Veturi Growth Partners. Also, some non-profit organizations have their premises on Design Factory. There are also research projects going on at DF.

Design Factory is physically located in Otaniemi, specifically in Betonimiehenkuja 5, Espoo.

History
Design Factory was opened in September 2008 and the opening ceremony was held on October 3, 2008. During Fall 2008 and spring 2009, the Product Development Project (PDP) took place in the factory.

The building

The building itself is an old wood processing technology building, which has been redecorated. Six bigger places: the stage, the studio, lobby, engine room, puuhamaa, and cafe constitute the main spaces of Design Factory.

References

External links

Design Factory wiki
Design Factory – Aaltoyliopisto.info
Design Research at UIAH – Co-designing Design Factory
Design Factory Workshop Report: Co-Designing Design Factory
Letter from Finland: a little piece of design thinking heaven – Core77
thisisFINLAND 2/2009 Peter Marten: Limitless by design
Ruukki – Cooperation with students generated new ideas for rainwater systems
PDP Gala 2008 @ Design Factory (YouTube video)

Aalto University
Educational institutions established in 2008
2008 establishments in Finland
Product design